Nathuram Premi was a writer, publisher, poet, editor, and linguist in the field of Jainism as well as Hindi literature. A budding poet, he wrote under the nom de plume of "Premi". Although belonging to the Digambara sect of Jainism, he adopted a non-sectarian attitude and published and translated many Digambara as well as Śvetāmbara works. Working as a clerk in a firm in Mumbai he rose to establish his own publishing house and bookstore Hindi Granth Ratnākar Kāryālay which published works of many of the biggest names in Indian literature, including Munshi Premchand, Hajariprasad Dvivedi, Jainendrakumar, Yashpal, Swami Satyabhakta, Sharatchandra Chatterjee and Rabindranath Tagore. The bookshop and publishing house now called Hindi Granth Karyalay is now being managed by his grandson and great-grandson 100 years after its establishment.

Early life

Born on 26 November 1881 in Deori, in the district of Sagar in Bundelkhand, Madhya Pradesh, Nāthūrām Premī was the eldest child of Tundelal Modi, a travelling merchant of modest means, belonging to the Paravāra community of Digambara Jains hailing from Bundelkhand. He studied in grammar school and was the monitor of his class. He cleared his pre-high school exams in 1898 and became a schoolteacher nearby at Rehli. In the late 1890s, he married Rama Devi, who was from the nearby village of Sarkheda, in the district of Sagar.

Career in Hindi and Jain literature

Nāthūrām Premī excelled in the field of literature as a poet, editor, writer and publisher earning respect and affection of his contemporaries like Munshi Premchand, Mahaviraprasad Dwivedi, Rahul Sankrityayan, Pandit Sukhlalji, Muni Jinavijayaji, Ganeshprasadji Varni, Pandit Becharadasji Doshi, Pandit Agarchand Nahata and Dr Dalsukh Malvania. Premiji and Munshi Premchand were close friends, and he published the first edition of Munshi Premchand's classic novel, Godān. He also published Premchand's short story collections entitled Nava Nidhi and Sapta Saroj.

A budding poet 

Under the inspiration of his guru Syed Amir Ali Mir, Nathuram became a budding poet, writing in Urdu and Braj under the nom de plume of "Premi". Since then he was affectionately called Premiji by his friends and contemporaries. His poems were published in the literary magazines of the time, Rasika Mitra, Rasika Vātikā and Kāvya Sudhākara.

Editor and writer

Establishment of Hindi Granth Karyalay

On 24 September 1912 Premiji founded the publishing house Hindi Granth Ratnākar Kāryālay (now known as Hindi Granth Karyalay) at C.P. Tank, Mumbai. It was to become the foremost Hindi publishing house in India and is also the oldest bookstore of Mumbai. The first publication was a Hindi translation of John Stuart Mill's On Liberty, titled Svādhīnatā translated by Mahavira Prasad Dvivedi. He published almost the entire oeuvre of Sharat Chandra Chatterji, the Bengali writer, and some works of Rabindranath Tagore, such as Ānkh kī Kirkirī, and Naukā Dūbī. Premiji also published Hindi translations of the Gujarati writer KM Munshi, such as Gujarāt ke Nāth and Pātan kā Prabhutva. Other famous works published include Munshi Premchand's classic novel, Godān and short story collections titled Nava Nidhi and Sapta Saroj. He also published works of then new writers such as Hajariprasad Dvivedi, Jainendrakumar, Yashpal, Acharya Chatursen, and Pandit Sudarshan. He also published the Bengali plays of Dvijendra Lal Rai for the first time in Hindi.

In memory of Seth Manikchandra, Premiji established the Manikacandra Jain Granthamālā wherein he published Jain scriptures, for the first time systematically edited by philologists. The Manikacandra Jain Granthamālā published over 48 Digambara Jain texts, mostly written in Prakrit, Apabhramśa or Sanskrit. He ran the Manikacandra Jain Granthamālā on an honorary basis between 1915 and the 1950s selling all the books at cost price. When his health began to fail, it was decided to hand over the series to Bhāratīya Jñānapītha in Varanasi.

A non-sectarian Jain scholar

Premiji was non-sectarian in his attitude and shared a good rapport with many Svetambara scholars. Besides many Digambara scriptures, he published and translated many Śvetāmbara scriptures. He once remarked to Sukhlalji that he wished that the learned Digambara scholars would give up their sectarian views. During those times there used to be heated debate whether Acarya Umāsvāti (Umāsvāmī) belonged to the Śvetāmbara or the Digambara tradition. Premiji, although a Digambara himself, went against views of Digambara community and opined that he was neither, but belonged to the Yāpanīya tradition. Pt. Sukhlal Sanghvi, a Śvetāmbara Jain scholar observed Premiji's non-sectarian attitude:
"He was considered to be a Pandit – a scholar of Jain tradition. To me it was a surprise! How could his writings be so impartial and audacious? I had come in contact with many Jain friends and scholars, but until then, excepting a few, I had not come across any scholar who was as non-sectarian or fearless as Premiji. So I had developed the perception that it was impossible to find a Jain scholar who was non-sectarian as well as fearless. Premiji's writings gradually made me realise that I had the wrong notion. This was the foremost reason for me to be attracted towards him.
[...]
We had an excellent understanding of traditions of one another but we had no sectarian complicities."

Contribution to other Indian languages

Social reformer

Premiji's legacy

Under his tutelage, Hindi Granth Ratnākar Kāryālay became India's No. 1 publishers of Hindi literature. In recognition of his contributions to Indian literature, the acclaimed Hindi novelist Vishnu Prabhakar called Premiji the "Bhīsma Pitāmaha" of Hindi publishing.

Premiji had suffered from asthma for a long time and died owing to old age on 30 January 1960. He left behind his daughter-in-law and two grandsons, Yashodhar Modi and Vidyadhar Modi. They are continuing his legacy along with their children.

In Premiji's memory, his grandson Yashodhar Modi has started the Pandit Nathuram Premi Research Series. This series has published select volumes focusing on subjects as varied as Jainism, philosophy and yoga and published original texts by ancient and medieval Jain ascetics such as Kundakunda, Samantabhadra, Pūjyapāda, Joindu, Prabhācandra, Vādirāja, Bhāvadeva and many others, usually accompanied by translation in either Hindi or English.

Also, modern scholars such as Premiji himself, Prof. Ludwig Alsdorf, Prof. Maurice Bloomfield, Prof. Willem Bollée and Dr. Jaykumar Jalaj have been and are being published in the Pandit Nathuram Premi Research Series.

Pandit Nathuram Premi Research Series

Jain Studies : Their Present State and Future Tasks
By Prof Dr Ludwig Alsdorf
English tr. by Bal Patil P
{Pandit Nathuram Premi Research Series Volume 1}
Published in 2006

The Story of Paesi
Prakrit text in Roman and Devanagari
English tr. by Prof Dr Willem Bollée
{Pandit Nathuram Premi Research Series Volume 2}
Published in 2005

Ratnakaranda Shravakacara
Sanskrit text by Acarya Samantabhadra
Hindi tr. by Dr Jaykumar Jalaj
{Pandit Nathuram Premi Research Series Volume 3}
Published in 2006, 2006

Vyavahara Bhashya Pithika
Prakrit text in Roman
English tr. by Prof Dr Willem Bollée
{Pandit Nathuram Premi Research Series Volume 4}
Published in 2006, 2011

Samadhitantra
Sanskrit text by Acarya Pujyapada
Hindi tr. by Dr Jaykumar Jalaj
{Pandit Nathuram Premi Research Series Volume 5}
Published in 2006, 2006, 2008

Atthapahuda
Prakrit text by Acarya Kundakunda
Hindi tr. by Dr Jaykumar Jalaj
{Pandit Nathuram Premi Research Series Volume 6}
Published in 2006, 2008

Tattvarthasutra
Sanskrit text by Acarya Prabhacandra
Hindi tr. by Dr Jaykumar Jalaj
{Pandit Nathuram Premi Research Series Volume 7}
Published in 2008

Yogamrit : Yog Sahaj Jivan Vigyan
By Mahavir Sainik
{Pandit Nathuram Premi Research Series Volume 8}
Published in 2006

Paramatmaprakasha
Apabhramsa text by Acarya Joindu
Hindi tr. by Dr Jaykumar Jalaj
{Pandit Nathuram Premi Research Series Volume 9}
Published in 2007

Yogasara
Apabhramsa text by Acarya Joindu
Hindi tr. by Dr Jaykumar Jalaj
{Pandit Nathuram Premi Research Series Volume 10}
Published in 2007, 2009

Dhyanastava
Sanskrit text by Acarya Bhaskaranandi
Hindi tr. by Dr Jaykumar Jalaj
{Pandit Nathuram Premi Research Series Volume 11}
Published in 2007

Dhyanashataka
Prakrit text by Jinabhadragani Kshamashramana
Hindi tr. by Dr Jaykumar Jalaj
Published in 2007, 2009
{Pandit Nathuram Premi Research Series Volume 12}

Barasa Anuvekkha
Prakrit text by Acarya Kundakunda
Sanskrit tr. & Hindi gloss by Pt. Nathuram Premi
{Pandit Nathuram Premi Research Series Volume 13}
Published in 2010

Ishtopadesha
Sanskrit text by Acarya Pujyapada
Hindi tr. by Dr Jaykumar Jalaj
{Pandit Nathuram Premi Research Series Volume 14}
Published in 2007, 2009

Life and Stories of the Jain Saviour Parshvanatha
An English tr. of Acarya Bhavadeva's Parsvacaritram
by Prof Dr Maurice Bloomfield
{Pandit Nathuram Premi Research Series Volume 15}
Published in 2008

Tattvasara
Prakrit text by Acarya Devasena
Sanskrit gloss by Muni Ratnabhanuvijay
English tr. by Manish Modi
{Pandit Nathuram Premi Research Series Volume 16}

The Apabhramsha of Svayambhudeva's Paumacariu
By Dr Eva de Clercq
{Pandit Nathuram Premi Research Series Volume 17}
Published in 2010

Jainism and the Definition of Religion
By Dr Piotr Balcerowicz
{Pandit Nathuram Premi Research Series Volume 18}
Published in 2009

Dravyasamgraha
Prakrit text by Acarya Nemicandra
English tr. by Prof Dr Nalini Balbir
{Pandit Nathuram Premi Research Series Volume 19}
Published in 2010

Tattvarthasutra
Sanskrit text by Acarya Prabhacandra
Hindi tr. by Dr Jaykumar Jalaj, English tr. by Anish Shah
{Pandit Nathuram Premi Research Series Volume 20}

Rayanasara
Prakrit text by Acarya Kundakunda
Hindi tr. by Dr Jaykumar Jalaj
{Pandit Nathuram Premi Research Series Volume 21}
.

Jainism : An Eternal Pilgrimage
By Bal Patil
{Pandit Nathuram Premi Research Series Volume 23}
Published in 2008, 2011

Dravyasamgraha
Prakrit text by Acarya Nemicandra
Hindi tr. by Dr Jaykumar Jalaj
{Pandit Nathuram Premi Research Series Volume 24}
Published in 2009

Parshvanathacaritram
Sanskrit text by Acarya Vadiraja
{Pandit Nathuram Premi Research Series Volume 25}

Parshvacaritram : The Life of Parshva
Sanskrit text by Acarya Gunabhadra
English tr. by Prof Dr Willem Bollée
{Pandit Nathuram Premi Research Series Volume 26}
Published in 2008

Jain Sahitya aur Itihas
By Pt. Nathuram Premi
{Pandit Nathuram Premi Research Series Volume 27}
Published in 1942, 1956, 2012

Tales of Atonement
Stories from Malayagiri's Commentary on the Vyavahara Bhashya
English tr. by Prof Dr Willem Bollée
{Pandit Nathuram Premi Research Series Volume 28}
Published in 2008

Yogashastra : A Handbook on the Three Jewels of Jainism
Sanskrit text by Acarya Hemacandra
English tr. by Prof Dr Olle Qvarnström
{Pandit Nathuram Premi Research Series Volume 29}

Samayasara
Prakrit text by Acarya Kundakunda
Hindi translation by Dr Jaykumar Jalaj
{Pandit Nathuram Premi Research Series Volume 30}
2012

Dhyanabattisi
Braj text by Banarasidasa
English tr. by Jerome Petit
{Pandit Nathuram Premi Research Series Volume 31}
Published in 2010

Tattvarthasutra
Sanskrit text by Acarya Umasvati
English tr. by Prof Dr Duli Chandra Jain
{Pandit Nathuram Premi Research Series Volume 32}

Svarupa Sambodhana
Right Instruction on the Nature of the Soul
Sanskrit text by Acarya Akalanka
English tr., notes and introduction by Nagin J. Shah
{Pandit Nathuram Premi Research Series Volume 33}
Published in 2011

Shastrasarasamuccaya
Sanskrit text by Acarya Maghanandi
English tr. by Shreyans Sukhani
{Pandit Nathuram Premi Research Series Volume 34}

Three Prakrit Grammars
By Saartje Verbeke
{Pandit Nathuram Premi Research Series Volume 35}
Published in 2010

Ishtopadesha
Sanskrit text by Acarya Pujyapada
Gujarati tr. by Pravina Mehta, English tr. by Manish Modi
{Pandit Nathuram Premi Research Series Volume 36}
Published in 2010

Bhaktamara Stotra
Sanskrit text by Acarya Manatunga
Hindi poetic tr. and gloss by Pt Nathuram Premi, English tr. by Manish Modi
{Pandit Nathuram Premi Research Series Volume 37}

Mrityu Mahotsava
Sanskrit text by an Unknown Writer
Hindi tr. by Shreyans Sukhani, Gujarati tr. by Dr Shilpa Vasani, English tr. by Manish Modi
{Pandit Nathuram Premi Research Series Volume 38}
Published in 2010

Aradhanasara
Prakrit text by Acarya Devasena
English tr. by Prof Dr Nalini Balbir
{Pandit Nathuram Premi Research Series Volume 39}
Published in 2010

Tattvarthasutra : That Which Is
Sanskrit text by Acarya Umasvati
English tr. by Nathmal Tantia
{Pandit Nathuram Premi Research Series Volume 40}

Ratnakarandaka Shravakacara
Sanskrit text by Acarya Samantabhadra
English tr. by Prof Dr Willem Bollée
{Pandit Nathuram Premi Research Series Volume 41}
2012

Bibliography

Aggarwal, Vasudev Sharan (Ed.). Premī Abhinandana Grantha. Tikamgarh: Premī Abhinandana Grantha Samiti, 1946.
Premī, Nāthūrām. Jain Sāhitya aur Itihās. Second Edition. Mumbai: Samśodhita Sāhitya Mālā  1, 1942/1956.
Banārasīdāsa. Ardha Kathānaka. Ed. with a detailed Preface by Nāthūrām Premī. Mumbai: Samśodhita Sāhitya Mālā  2, 1946/1957.
Amrtacandra, Ācārya.  Ed. with an Introduction by Nāthūrām Premī. Āgās: Śrīmad Rājacandra Āśrama, 1904.
Goyaliya, Ayodhyaprasad. Jain Jāgarana ke Agradūta. Varanasi: Bhāratīya Jñānapītha, 1952
Śāstrī, Phūlcandra (Ed.). Paravāra Jain Samāj kā Itihās. Jabalpur: Śrī  Digambara Jain Paravāra Sabhā, 1992.

Footnotes and references

External links
http://www.gohgk.com
https://web.archive.org/web/20151217120702/http://www.hindibooks.8m.com/
http://www.jainstudy.org
http://www.bombaysamachar.com/frmStoryShow.aspx?sNo=21964
http://indianexpress.com/article/cities/mumbai/a-publishing-house-thrives-on-a-legacy-of-reform-ushered-in-by-its-founder-2767539/#sthash.4SKmdTxg.dpuf

People from Sagar, Madhya Pradesh
1881 births
1960 deaths
Scholars of Jainism
Indian Sanskrit scholars
Writers from Madhya Pradesh
20th-century Indian translators
Translators to Hindi
Indian social reformers
19th-century Indian Jain writers
20th-century Indian Jain writers
Indian religious writers